{{DISPLAYTITLE:C13H18O2}}
The molecular formula C13H18O2 (molar mass: 206.28 g/mol, exact mass: 206.1307 u) may refer to:

 Ibuprofen
 Dexibuprofen